Uchaly (Uçalı) is a rural locality (a selo) and the administrative centre of Uchalinsky Selsoviet, Uchalinsky District, Bashkortostan, Russia. The population was 6,049 as of 2010. There are 90 streets.

Geography 
Uchaly is located 8 km northeast of Uchaly (the district's administrative centre) by road. Barvikha is the nearest rural locality.

References 

Rural localities in Uchalinsky District